Mera Gaon Mera Desh is a 1971 Indian action drama film, directed by Raj Khosla, written by Akhtar Romani, and starring Dharmendra, Asha Parekh in lead roles and Vinod Khanna as the villain. It was a box office success.
The film contains many hit songs including: "Apni Prem Kahaniyan", "Aaya Aaya Atariya Pe Koi Chor", "Sona Lai Ja Re", "Kuch Kehta Hai Yeh Saawan" and "Maar Diya Jaye Ke Chhod Diya Jaye". The film was remade in Telugu as Manchi Babayi.

Plot
Havaldar Major Jaswant Singh (Jayant) makes a citizen's arrest of petty thief Ajit (Dharmendra) and hands him over to the police, and after due process of law he is sentenced to six months in jail. After completing his sentence, the jailer asks him to approach Jaswant Singh for employment, and so he does. Jaswant asks him to help him with his farming work. Ajit meets Anju (Asha Parekh - lead female) and both fall in love. Ajit hears of Jabbar Singh (Vinod Khanna) a dacoit who is terrorizing the surrounding community, and Ajit decides to take on Jabbar. In retaliation, Jabbar abducts Anju, and instructs Ajit to come unarmed. Ajit decides to follow these instructions, however, as soon as he reaches Jabbar's hideout, he too is captured, and at the mercy of Jabbar and Munni (Laxmi Chhaya), who has been scorned by Ajit, and it is now up to her to decide Ajit's fate.

Cast

Soundtrack

Awards and nominations
Dharmendra received a Filmfare nomination for Best Actor, the only one for the film.

References

External links

1971 films
1970s Hindi-language films
Films directed by Raj Khosla
Indian action films
Films scored by Laxmikant–Pyarelal
Hindi films remade in other languages
1971 action films